is a railway station in the city of Nikkō, Tochigi, Japan, operated by the Yagan Railway.

Lines
Ojika-Kōgen Station is served by the Yagan Railway Aizu Kinugawa Line and is located 25.0 rail kilometers from the opposing terminal at Shin-Fujiwara Station.

Station layout
The station has a single side platform connected to the station building, serving traffic in both directions.

Adjacent stations

History
Ojika-Kōgen Station opened on October 9, 1986.

Others
This station is stopped by the last service of Tobu Limited Express Revaty Aizu bound to Asakusa Station and local trains.

Surrounding area
The station is located in an isolated mountain area, with no buildings around for several hundred meters.

In media
The second episode of the series "Tetsu Ota Michiko, 20,000 km" is dedicated to this station

External links

Yagen Railway Station information 

Railway stations in Tochigi Prefecture
Railway stations in Japan opened in 1986
Nikkō, Tochigi